Elachista vasrana is a moth in the family Elachistidae. It was described by Lauri Kaila in 2000. It is found in Peru.

References

Moths described in 2000
vasrana
Moths of South America